The 2010 Studena Croatia Open Umag was a tennis tournament played on outdoor clay courts. It was the 21st edition of the Croatia Open Umag, and was part of the ATP World Tour 250 Series of the 2010 ATP World Tour. It took place at the International Tennis Center in Umag, Croatia, from July 26 through August 1, 2010.

ATP entrants

Seeds

*Seedings based on the July 19, 2010 rankings.

Other entrants
The following players received wildcards into the singles main draw:
  Ivan Dodig
  Franko Škugor
  Antonio Veić

The following players received entry from the qualifying draw:
  Simone Bolelli
  Gerald Melzer
  Olivier Patience
  Simone Vagnozzi

Finals

Singles

 Juan Carlos Ferrero defeated  Potito Starace, 6–4, 6–4
 It was Ferrero's third title of the year and 15th of his career.

Doubles

 Leoš Friedl /  Filip Polášek defeated  František Čermák /  Michal Mertiňák, 6–3, 7–6(9–7)

External links
 Official website